Time in Arizona, as in all U.S. states, is regulated by the United States Department of Transportation as well as by state and tribal law.

All of Arizona is in the Mountain Time Zone. Since 1968, most of the state—with exceptions noted below—does not observe daylight saving time and remains on Mountain Standard Time (MST) all year. This results in most of Arizona having the same time as neighboring California each year from March to November, when locations in the Pacific Time Zone observe daylight saving time.

Daylight saving time

Unlike most of the United States, Arizona does not observe daylight saving time (DST), with the exception of the Navajo Nation, which does observe DST. The Hopi Reservation, which is not part of the Navajo Nation but is geographically surrounded by it, also does not observe DST.

Reasoning
Because of Arizona's hot climate, DST is largely considered unnecessary. The argument against extending the daylight hours into the evening is that people prefer to do their activities in the cooler morning temperatures.
The Navajo Nation, a semi-autonomous Native American territory, follows the United States DST schedule. It lies in northeastern Arizona, northwestern New Mexico, and southeastern Utah and thus maintains the same time throughout tribal lands despite state borders.

Legislative history
On March 21, 1968, the Arizona legislature passed the final version of SB 1, placing Arizona under standard time. The bill had been working its way through the legislature since January of that year, and was sponsored by state Senators Tenney, Goetze, Porter, Halacy, Garfield, Campbell, Lewis, Gregovich, Giss, Crowley, and Holsclaw. It passed the Senate 25–3–2, and afterwards the bill was passed by the House 49–1–10. It was approved by Governor Jack Williams the same day.

tz database
The tz database version  contains two entries for Arizona:

Example
When daylight saving is not active, the time in Phoenix and Albuquerque, New Mexico is the same (Mountain Standard Time), and both are one hour ahead of Los Angeles, California (Pacific Standard Time).

When daylight saving is active, the time in Phoenix (Mountain Standard Time) and Los Angeles (Pacific Daylight Time) is the same, and both are one hour behind Albuquerque (Mountain Daylight Time).

The time in Navajo Nation is always the same as in Albuquerque.

References

Arizona
Geography of Arizona